Laurel Mountain is the fourth highest peak in Oregon's Central Coast Range with an elevation of . The peak is located in Polk County west of the city of Dallas.

Climate
Laurel Mountain has a hyperhumid maritime climate, on the border between Mediterranean (Csb), oceanic (Cfb) and subpolar oceanic (Cfc/Csc). Rainfall is extremely heavy between October and April, and even in the dry months of July and August fog is very frequent and prevents soils and vegetation from drying out appreciably.

References

Mountains of Oregon
Mountains of the Oregon Coast Range
Landforms of Polk County, Oregon